Hellgraben is a small river in Hesse, Germany. It flows into the Kinzig near Steinau an der Straße.

See also
List of rivers of Hesse

Rivers of Hesse
Rivers of the Spessart
Rivers of Germany